The 1942 Palestine Cup (HaGavia HaEretz-Israeli) was the thirteenth season of the Israeli Football Association's nationwide football cup competition.

This edition of the competition is notorious for two debacles, which led to the qualification of Maccabi Haifa to the finals. The first, a set of appeals on the first round tie between Hapoel Petah Tikva and Maccabi Haifa, which delayed the competition for nearly two months until a final decision, which was given through arbitration.

The second was caused by a controversial decision by the EIFA regarding the quarter-final tie between Maccabi Tel Aviv and Arab team Shabab al-Arab from Haifa. The match between the two ended with a Maccabi win of 7–4 . However, the Haifa club appealed against the result, as Maccabi fielded four ineligible players, due to their age and their applicability to army service. The EIFA decided to confirm the tie's result, but to exclude Maccabi from the rest of the competition, instead of awarding the tie to Shabab al-Arab. The ensuing turmoil among the Arab clubs was among the things that led to the re-establishment of the APSF.

As Maccabi Haifa was due to meet Maccabi Tel Aviv at the semi-finals, it advanced to the final, where it was defeated by a record score line of 12–1 by Beitar Tel Aviv.

Results

First round
Matches were played on 14 February 1942.

Replays

Second round

Quarter-finals

Semi-finals

Final

Notes

References
100 Years of Football 1906-2006, Elisha Shohat (Israel), 2006

External links
 Israel Football Association website 

Israel State Cup
Cup
Israel State Cup seasons